Lynnwood is a development in the Little Neck neighborhood of the independent city of Virginia Beach, Virginia in the United States of America.

Communities in Virginia Beach, Virginia